Närpes Kraft Fotbollsförening (abbreviated Kraft) is a football club from Närpes, Finland. The original club was formed in 1930 and their home ground is at the Mosedal.  The men's football first team currently plays in the Kakkonen (Second Division).

Background

IF Kraft or Kraft Närpes is a sports club that was founded in 1930. The club has specialised in a number of sports, including cycling, skiing, athletics, football, and ice hockey. Ice hockey was introduced at Kraft in 1970, and the team currently plays in Division II, Finland's fourth highest league. The cycling section of the club started in 1982.

Kraft is probably best known for its football club with the men's first team having played 7 seasons in the Ykkönen (First Division), the second tier of Finnish football in 1997 and 1999–2004.  They also have had four spells covering 26 seasons in the third tier, the Kakkonen (Second Division), in 1976–84, 1986–96, 1998 and 2005–09. The football section broke away from the main club in 1997.

Relegation at the end of the 2009 season to the Kolmonen (Third Division) has sadly brought fourth tier football back to Mosedal.  It was 25 years ago in 1985 since Kraft last played at this level.

The highest ever attendance for a Kraft match was in 1974 in when 2,406 people attended the home game with Lappfjärds Bollklubb. The largest attendance for a Kraft match at Mosedal was in 1997 in when 1,468 people attended the home game with FC Haka in the Ykkönen (First Division).

The club is now able to make use of the new Närpiö Idrottshall, "Ball Hall", which was completed in autumn 2008.  The hall's size is 97.5 metres by 67 metres and has a height of 16 metres. The venue is able to accommodate an artificial turf pitch 90 metres by 60 metres.

Season to season

Club structure

Närpes Kraft Fotbollsförening run a large number of teams including 2 men's teams, 1 ladies team, 7 boys teams and 4 girls teams.

2010 season

Kraft Men's Team are competing in the Kolmonen (Third Division) section administered by the Vaasa SPL.  This is the fourth highest tier in the Finnish football system.  In 2009 Kraft finished in 13th place in Group B of the Kakkonen (Second Division) and were relegated.

Kraft /2 are participating in the Nelonen (Fourth Division) administered by the Vaasa SPL.

Current squad

Footnotes

External links
Official Football Website
Finnish Wikipedia

Football clubs in Finland
Association football clubs established in 1930
1930 establishments in Finland